09-15-2000, Brussels is a live album by the German avant-garde/experimental band Einstürzende Neubauten and was released in 2002.

Track listing

Personnel
Einstürzende Neubauten
 Blixa Bargeld – lead vocals, guitar, keyboards.
 Alexander Hacke – bass, guitar, vocals.
 N.U. Unruh – special built instruments, percussion, vocals.
 Jochen Arbeit – guitar, vocals.
 Rudi Moser – special built instruments, percussion, vocals.

Notes
Ein Seltener Vogel had never been played before this show, and "would probably never be played again", according to Blixa Bargeld during its performance.  The song would later turn up on the band's 2004 album Perpetuum Mobile.

References

Einstürzende Neubauten live albums
2002 live albums
Caroline Records live albums